The color mulberry is displayed on the right. This color is a representation of the color of mulberry jam or pie. This was a Crayola crayon color from 1958 to 2003.

The first recorded use of mulberry as a color name in English was in 1776.

It has some similarities with the color raspberry, a shade of red also called mulberry in some countries of Latin America.

General Motors Holden released a model in the color Mulberry. It was the 1979 SL/E Statesman.

Prismacolor also made a pencil after the color mulberry which was number 995

See also
 List of colors
 Murrey

References

Shades of violet